Dewdrop may refer to:
Dew
Dewdrop, Kentucky
Dewdrop Glacier
Daddy Dewdrop

See also
Dew Drop, California
Doudrop